is a railway station in Ōita City, Ōita Prefecture, Japan. It is operated by JR Kyushu and is on the Hōhi Main Line.

Lines

Layout 
The station, which is unstaffed, consists of two side platforms serving two tracks. There is no station building, only shelters on the platforms for waiting passengers. A separate shelter at the station entrance houses an automatic ticket vending machine. There is a ticket booth but this is unstaffed.

Adjacent stations

History
On the same day, Takio was opened as one of several intermediate stations along the track. On 2 December 1928, the entire track from Kumamoto through Takio to Ōita was designated as the Hōhi Main Line. With the privatization of Japanese National Railways (JNR), the successor of JGR, on 1 April 1987, Takio came under the control of JR Kyushu.

On 17 March 2018, Takio became a "Smart Support Station". Under this scheme, although the station is unstaffed, passengers can receive assistance via intercom from staff at a central support centre.

Passenger statistics
In fiscal 2016, the station was used by an average of 408 passengers daily (boarding passengers only), and it ranked 265th among the busiest stations of JR Kyushu.

See also
List of railway stations in Japan

References

External links
Takio (JR Kyushu)

Railway stations in Ōita Prefecture
Railway stations in Japan opened in 1914
Ōita (city)